Adolfo Baturone Colombo (24 February 1904 – 9 November 1999) was a Spanish admiral who served as Minister of the Navy of Spain between 1969 and 1973, during the Francoist dictatorship.

References

1904 births
1999 deaths
Defence ministers of Spain
Government ministers during the Francoist dictatorship